Fat Families is a documentary reality show that was broadcast on Sky1 from 6 January to 30 December 2010. Weight loss expert Steve Miller helps overweight families improve their lifestyles and eating habits.

During each programme Steve initially spends 24 hours with the family and discovers what they eat on a normal day. He then spends the rest of the week educating the family about what they can do to help them lose weight. At the end of the week Steve modifies the family home to keep them motivated to lose weight. The families are then given a further 9 weeks to lose weight with Steve giving each person a target weight loss.

Families are also revisited months later in episodes titled "Second Helpings" to see how they have progressed.

Episodes

Series 1

References

External links 
 Episode Guide Series 1 Radio Times.
 Episode Guide Series 2 Radio Times.

Sky UK original programming
2010s British documentary television series
2010s British reality television series
2010 British television series debuts
2010 British television series endings
Obesity in the United Kingdom